Mauritius competed at the 2019 World Championships in Athletics in Doha, Qatar, from 27 September–6 October 2019.

Results
(q – qualified, NM – no mark, SB – season best)

Men 
Track and road events

References

Nations at the 2019 World Athletics Championships
World Championships in Athletics
Mauritius at the World Championships in Athletics